"Carmen Brasilia" is the second single of the Anarchic System, released in 1972 and labeled as "the new popcorn".

This song modernizes the Carmen opera theme written by Georges Bizet by using a Minimoog to synthesize the electronics plops samples of the "Popcorn" song.

Track listing 
Face A
"Carmen Brasilia" (G. Bizet, C. Gordanne, engineering I. Wira) — 2:13

Face B
"Marina" (Paul de Senneville, Olivier Toussaint) — 2:50

Personnel 
Musicians directed by Hervé Roy

Distribution 
for France : AZ Records index catalog AZ 10 810, Distribution Discodis index catalog SG 411

Anarchic System songs
1972 singles
1972 songs